Tikkabilla is a UK children's television programme, shown on CBeebies. The programme aims to educate pre-school children in an entertaining manner. The title "Tikkabilla" comes from the Hindi word meaning "Hopscotch", a popular children's game.

Format
The show features two different presenters and a small dragon puppet named Tamba, who resembles Spyro the Dragon in colouration. Tamba serves as the programme's naive child; the programme's educational content is introduced as the presenters explain things to Tamba. Whilst Tamba appears in every episode, a team of presenters take it in turns to pair-up in each show. These presenters include Justin Fletcher, Sarah-Jane Honeywell, Simon Davies, Lorna Laidlaw, Paul Ewing, Veejay Kaur (series 3–4), Toni Fruitin and Amit Sharma (both series 4 only) and Beverly Hills (series 1–2 only). Tamba is performed by puppeteers Sue Eves (series 1 to 4) who created the voice for Tamba; Alison McGowan (series 2 and 3) and Katherine Smee (series 4). Sue Eves has also written many scripts for the programme.

Much of the show's format follows that of 1964–1988 UK children's programme Play School and later show Playdays. Tikkabilla presenter Simon Davies also presented Play School in its later years and Playdays in its early years and Justin Fletcher played Mr Jolly in the live stage show production of Playdays. In the Tikkabilla studio, which features a large, colourful house, the presenters and Tamba perform songs, tell stories, play games and make things. Occasionally, special guests visit, normally to demonstrate a special skill or performance. The iconic square, round and arched windows made famous by Play School are again used as a device to transport the viewer from the studio to the outside, real world. Location items, sometimes featuring the presenters and Tamba and usually including young children, introduce the wider world to the young audience.

Tikkabilla features mini-series inside the programme, such as Bonny, Banana and Mo, Sami's Worlds, Summerton Mill and Higgledy House, the latter two of which were later shown as standalone programmes on CBeebies. Tikkabilla sometimes shows animated clips originally from other educational BBC programmes mostly from Words and Pictures and Numbertime. One episode once showed an animated clip from Hotch Potch House.

Production
Beverly Hills writes for the programme as well as writing for sister show The Story Makers. Francis Haines and Liz Kitchen wrote the majority of the programme's music. Francis Haines and Jake Hook co-wrote one of the songs.

External links
 
CBeebies - Tikkabilla at bbc.co.uk (Archived)

BBC children's television shows
2002 British television series debuts
2000s British children's television series
2007 British television series endings
British preschool education television series
British television shows featuring puppetry
2000s preschool education television series
CBeebies
Television series by BBC Studios
Television series about dragons